Cyprus participated in the Eurovision Song Contest 2006 with the song "Why Angels Cry" written by Peter Yiannakis. The song was performed by Annet Artani. The Cypriot broadcaster Cyprus Broadcasting Corporation (CyBC) organised the national final A Song for Europe in order to select the Cypriot entry for the 2006 contest in Athens, Greece. The national final featured 20 entries and consisted of two semi-finals and a final, resulting in the selection of Annet Artani with "Why Angels Cry" at the final on 22 February 2008. 

Cyprus competed in the semi-final of the Eurovision Song Contest which took place on 18 May 2006. Performing during the show in position 9, "Why Angels Cry" was not announced among the top 10 entries of the semi-final and therefore did not qualify to compete in the final. It was later revealed that Cyprus placed fifteenth out of the 23 participating countries in the semi-final with 57 points.

Background 

Prior to the 2006 contest, Cyprus had participated in the Eurovision Song Contest twenty-three times since their debut in the 1981 contest. Its best placing was fifth, which it achieved three times: in the 1982 competition with the song "Mono i agapi" performed by Anna Vissi, in the 1997 edition with "Mana mou" performed by Hara and Andreas Constantinou, and the 2004 contest with "Stronger Every Minute" performed by Lisa Andreas. Cyprus' least successful result was in the 1986 contest when it placed last with the song "Tora zo" by Elpida, receiving only four points in total. However, its worst finish in terms of points received was when it placed second to last in the 1999 contest with "Tha'nai erotas" by Marlain Angelidou, receiving only two points. In , the nation placed eighteenth in the final with "Ela Ela (Come Baby)" performed by Constantinos Christoforou.

The Cypriot national broadcaster, Cyprus Broadcasting Corporation (CyBC), broadcasts the event within Cyprus and organises the selection process for the nation's entry. CyBC confirmed their intentions to participate in the Eurovision Song Contest 2006 on 24 September 2005. Cyprus has used various methods to select the Cypriot entry in the past, such as internal selections and televised national finals to choose the performer, song or both to compete at Eurovision. In 2005, the broadcaster internally selected the artist and organised a national final to select the song. However, CyBC opted to organised a national final to select both the Cypriot artist and song for the 2006 contest.

Before Eurovision

A Song for Europe 
A Song for Europe was the national final format developed by CyBC in order to select Cyprus' entry for the Eurovision Song Contest 2006. The event took place at the CyBC Studio 3 in Nicosia, hosted by Alex Michael and Christina Marouchou and was broadcast on RIK 1, RIK Sat as well as in Greece on ERT Sat and online via CyBC's website cybc.cy. A Song for Europe consisted of 20 entries competing over three shows: two semi-finals on 11 and 12 February 2006, and the final on 22 February 2006. Each semi-final included 10 entries and the top five progressed to the final. In the final, the winner was selected from the remaining 10 entries. The results of each of the three shows were determined exclusively by televoting. In the final, the voting results of each of the five regions in Cyprus were converted to points from 1-8, 10 and 12 and assigned to the ten entries, while a sixth set of votes was based on the overall voting result.

Competing entries 
Artists and composers were able to submit their entries to the broadcaster between 24 September 2005 and 30 December 2005. At the conclusion of the deadline, 114 entries were received by CyBC and the 20 selected entries were announced on 4 January 2006. Among the competing artists was 2004 Cypriot Junior Eurovision entrant Marios Tofi. Peter Yiannakis co-composed the Cypriot Eurovision entry in 1986, and Mike Connaris composed the Cypriot Eurovision entry in 2004. Nine of the entries were later disqualified from the competition and replaced by an additional nine entries as they had either been submitted to other broadcasters participating in the 2006 contest or had been released before the broadcast of their respective semi-finals.

Shows

Semi-finals
The two semi-finals took place on 11 and 12 February 2006. In each semi-final 10 entries competed and a public televote solely selected five to progress to the final. In addition to the performances of the competing entries, the first semi-final featured guest performances by 1990 Spanish Eurovision entrants Azúcar Moreno and 1998 and 2005 Maltese Eurovision entrant Chiara, while the second semi-final featured guest performances by Maro Litra and 2000 British Eurovision entrant Nicki French.

Final
The final took place on 22 February 2006. The 10 remaining entries competed and the winner, "Why Angels Cry" performed by Annet Artani, was selected by a regional televote. In addition to the performances of the competing entries, the show featured guest performances by Stavros Konstantinou, 1984 and 1992 Irish Eurovision entrant Linda Martin, and 2001 and 2006 Maltese Eurovision entrant Fabrizio Faniello.

Controversy 
Following the Cypriot national final, seven of the ten finalists filed a formal complaint to CyBC requesting clarifications on the voting process as they had not been notified of the exact way the votes would be calculated prior to the competition (the regulations published by the broadcaster did not mention that the televoting results for the final would be calculated based on regions), and the details of the final results were never revealed. Claims that the victory was rigged for Annet Artani due to her popularity were also made by some of the finalists.

After an investigation from the Cypriot Administration in January 2007, the complaints were deemed valid as a regional televoting system was not possible for the nation due to lack of coverage from the telephone company (only votes submitted via landline were counted for Famagusta and Paphos, while only votes submitted via mobile phones were counted for Larnaca and Limassol). The controversy led to CyBC selecting both the artist and song via an internal selection for the 2007 contest.

Promotion
Annet Artani made several appearances across Europe to specifically promote "Why Angels Cry" as the Cypriot Eurovision entry.  On 15 March, Artani performed "Why Angels Cry" during the Greek Eurovision national final Feel the Party. Artani also took part in promotional activities across an additional 11 European countries, which included an appearance during the Eurovision Special Feminnem Show in Bosnia and Herzegovina on 28 April. Prior to the contest, "Why Angels Cry" was included on Artani's album Mia foni that was released in early April 2006, while a Cypriot welcome party was held in Athens on 14 May and was attended by entrants from Albania, Belgium and Turkey.

At Eurovision
According to Eurovision rules, all nations with the exceptions of the host country, the "Big Four" (France, Germany, Spain and the United Kingdom) and the ten highest placed finishers in the 2005 contest are required to qualify from the semi-final on 18 May 2006 in order to compete for the final on 20 May 2006; the top ten countries from the semi-final progress to the final. On 21 March 2006, a special allocation draw was held which determined the running order for the semi-final and Cyprus was set to perform in position 9, following the entry from Ireland and before the entry from Monaco. Annet Artani was joined on stage by five backing vocalists (Konstantinos Andronikou, Keanna Johnson, Anna Iliadou, Riana Athanasiou and Giorgos Georgiou, with whom she had previously performed on Britney Spears' Dream Within a Dream Tour) for the performance, and Cyprus was not announced among the top 10 entries at the end of the show and therefore failed to qualify to compete in the final. It was later revealed that Cyprus placed fifteenth in the semi-final, receiving a total of 57 points.

Both the semi-final and the final were broadcast in Cyprus on RIK 1 and RIK SAT with commentary by Evi Papamichail and Pampina Themistokleous in the semi-final, and Evi Papamichail and Vasso Komninou in the final. The Cypriot spokesperson, who announced the Cypriot votes during the final, was Constantinos Christoforou who represented Cyprus in 1996, 2002 and 2005.

Voting 
Below is a breakdown of points awarded to Cyprus and awarded by Cyprus in the semi-final and grand final of the contest. The nation awarded its 12 points to Armenia in the semi-final and to Greece in the final of the contest.

Points awarded to Cyprus

Points awarded by Cyprus

References

Bibliography 

 

2006
Countries in the Eurovision Song Contest 2006
Eurovision